The 2016 Turkmenistan Cup  was the 23rd season of the Turkmenistan Cup knockout tournament. The cup winner qualified for the 2017 AFC Cup.

Round 1

Round 2

Quarter-finals
 First Legs [Sep 13]
 Altyn Asyr    3-1 Şagadam       
 Energetik     0-0 Merw          
 Balkan        2-1 Köpetdag      
 Ahal          1-1 Aşgabat       

 Second Legs [Sep 20]
 Şagadam       0-1 Altyn Asyr    
 Merw          0-2 Energetik     
 Köpetdag      1-1 Balkan        
 Aşgabat       1-1 Ahal          [6-5 pen]

Semi-finals
 First Legs [Oct 4]
 Balkan        0-1 Aşgabat       
 Altyn Asyr    5-0 Energetik     

 Second Legs [Oct 7]
 Aşgabat       3-0 Balkan        
 Energetik     4-1 Altyn Asyr

Final
 Final [Oct 28, Daşoguz]
 Altyn Asyr    4-0 Aşgabat

See also
2016 Ýokary Liga
2016 Turkmenistan First League

References

Turkmenistan Cup
Turkmenistan
Turkmenistan Cup